Tumua ma Puleono is a political party in Samoa. The party is named for the traditional honorifics of Upolu and Savaii, the two main islands of Samoa. Its secretary is John Peterson.

The party opposes controversial constitutional amendments proposed by the Human Rights Protection Party government of Tuilaepa Aiono Sailele Malielegaoi and advocates for a greater voice for non-matai.  It intends to contest the April 2021 Samoan general election. As of 29 August 2020 the party had recruited three candidates to contest seats for it.

On 2 September 2020 the party announced it would join forces with the Faatuatua i le Atua Samoa ua Tasi and Samoa National Democratic Party parties to contest the 2021 election. SNDP and Tumua ma Puleono candidates will run under the FAST banner, with only one candidate in each constituency.

References

Political parties in Samoa
Political parties established in 2020